Carl Hollingsworth Eggen (1903–1985) was an Australian rugby league player who played in the 1920s and 1930s.

Playing career
Eggen played three seasons with South Sydney from 1929 to 1931. He won two premierships with Souths, playing prop in the 1929 Grand Final and the 1931 Grand Final.

Death
Eggen died on 8 April 1985, at Ramsgate, New South Wales.

References

South Sydney Rabbitohs players
Australian rugby league players
1903 births
1985 deaths
Rugby league props
Rugby league players from Sydney